Gilda Cobb-Hunter (born November 5, 1952, in Gifford, Florida) is a Democratic member of the South Carolina House of Representatives. She is the first African American woman elected to the State House from Orangeburg County. Cobb-Hunter is the former representative for South Carolina's 66th district. Following redistricting and the 2022 general election, Cobb-Hunter now represents South Carolina House District 95 and David L. O'Neal represents South Carolina's 66th district.

Cobb-Hunter serves as 1st Vice Chair of the House Ways and Means Committee.

Early life and education  
Gilda Cobb-Hunter earned her B.S. from Florida A&M University in 1973, and her M.A. from Florida State University in 1978. She  earned her LISW from the South Carolina Board of Social Work Examiners in 1990.

Career
Hunter was a teacher at Belleville Middle School in 1978. In 1979, she worked as an instructor at South Carolina State University. She  worked as a caseworker for the Orangeburg Department of Social Services from 1979 to 1984. She has been executive director of CASA Family Services since 1985. She currently works as a social work administrator. She is also a member of Branchville's NAACP chapter. She is  part of the North Carolina Civil Liberties Union chapter.

Accomplishments 
She was awarded Florida A & M University National Alumni Association 2014 Distinguished Alumnus Award.

References

African-American state legislators in South Carolina
African-American women in politics
Democratic Party members of the South Carolina House of Representatives
People from Indian River County, Florida
People from Orangeburg, South Carolina
1952 births
Living people
21st-century American politicians
21st-century American women politicians
21st-century African-American women
21st-century African-American politicians
20th-century African-American people
20th-century African-American women

Women state legislators in South Carolina